Fatehpur Sikri Lok Sabha constituency is one of the 80 Lok Sabha (parliamentary) constituencies in the Indian state of Uttar Pradesh. This constituency in Agra district came into existence in 2008 as a part of the implementation of delimitation of parliamentary constituencies based on the recommendations of the Delimitation Commission of India constituted in 2002.

Assembly segments
Presently, Fatehpur Sikri Lok Sabha constituency comprises five Vidhan Sabha (legislative assembly) segments. These are:

Kheragarh, Fatehabad and Bah assembly segments were earlier in erstwhile Firozabad Lok Sabha constituency, while Fatehpur Sikri assembly segment was earlier in erstwhile Agra Lok Sabha constituency.

Members of Parliament

Election results

2019 results

2014 results

2009 results

See also
 Agra district
 List of Constituencies of the Lok Sabha

Notes

References

External links
Fatehpur Sikri lok sabha  constituency election 2019 result details
Fatehpur Sikri lok sabha  constituency election 2019 date and schedule

Lok Sabha constituencies in Uttar Pradesh
Politics of Agra district